Sezai Temelli (born 1963) is a Turkish politician, and former chairman of the Peoples' Democratic Party (HDP) in Turkey. He is currently a Member of Parliament representing Van for the HDP.

Early life and career
Temelli was born in İstanbul and graduated from the branch of finance at the Istanbul University Faculty of Economics. He later completed his PhD there. He later became a lecturer in political science and public policy, specialising in finance. He was dismissed from the university during the purges of 2016.

Political career
Temelli is a founding member of the Peoples' Democratic Party (HDP). Before becoming its chairman, he served as the party's vice chairman responsible for economic policy. During the HDP 3rd ordinary congress held on 11 February 2018, he was elected chairman of the HDP alongside Pervin Buldan, who was elected chairwoman. Both candidates were elected unopposed. In February 2020, he was succeeded by Mithat Sancar. 

Temelli was elected as a HDP Member of Parliament for İstanbul's second electoral district in the June 2015 general election. He lost his seat in the snap November 2015 general election. In the general elections in June 2018 he was elected again elected to the parliament.

References

Living people
Members of the 25th Parliament of Turkey
Leaders of the Peoples' Democratic Party (Turkey)
Istanbul University alumni
Deputies of Istanbul
1963 births
Members of the 27th Parliament of Turkey
Academic staff of Istanbul University